Nan Hanchen (1895 – January 27, 1967) was the first governor of the People's Bank of China (1949–1954). He was born in Hongdong County, Linfen, Shanxi Province. He died during the Cultural Revolution. He was a delegate to the 1st National People's Congress, 2nd National People's Congress and 3rd National People's Congress.

1895 births
1967 deaths
Governors of the People's Bank of China
Victims of the Cultural Revolution
People from Linfen
Delegates to the 1st National People's Congress
Delegates to the 2nd National People's Congress
Delegates to the 3rd National People's Congress
Delegates to the National People's Congress from Shanxi